Mother Night (Susan Scarbo) is a fictional character appearing in American comic books published by Marvel Comics.

Publication history

Mother Night first appeared in Captain America #123 (March 1970), and was created by Stan Lee and Gene Colan.

Fictional character biography
Susan Scarbo was born in Teaneck, New Jersey. Susan and her brother, Melvin Scarbo, formed a sibling hypnosis stage act for profit. They quickly became professional criminals, hypnotizing innocent people into doing their bidding. Under the name Suprema, Susan soon attracted the attention of the Red Skull who hired Susan as a nanny for his daughter, Synthia Schmidt. Under Susan's tutelage, Synthia later became Sin.

After a successful infiltration of the original S.H.I.E.L.D. organization and an attempt at stealing a Wolverine Jet from them, Suprema became an enemy of Captain America. After some time, Susan was revealed as an aide to the Red Skull, and his daughter Sin's tutor, nanny, and instructor. Changing her name to Mother Night, she became the headmistress of the Sisters of Sin team for a short while, and was revealed to be running the Red Skull's youth indoctrination hate camp. When Magneto captured the Red Skull, Mother Night became a member of the Skeleton Crew in an attempt to rescue the Red Skull. She battled the Black Queen and her Hellfire Club mercenaries. She aided the Crew in the rescue of the Red Skull, and it was insinuated that she has or had a personal relationship with the Red Skull.

Mother Night, with the Machinesmith and Minster Blood (her brother Melvin), then brainwashed the Avengers' support crew. She attacked the Avengers by forcing them to relive their greatest nightmares, but she was captured by Vision. After this Red Skull replaced Mother Night with Viper as his lover. She then betrayed him for his actions toward Captain America and received a severe beating from Red Skull for it. Wishing to die at her ex-lover's hand, she asked Red Skull to kill her, to which he said no. Pitying her, teammate Cutthroat began an affair with Mother Night. This relationship ended when he was seemingly killed by Crossbones.

She and her team were eventually killed by The Winter Soldier.

Other versions

Marvel Max
She moved into a trailer park in Las Vegas, Nevada, in Wolverine Max. She meets Wolverine after watching him in an unsanctioned MMA fight. They have sex, and during pillow talk, she mentions that she is from Teaneck, New Jersey.  It is later revealed that she is not a psychic, but a hypnotist. She obtained her black sapphire from Brazil, and works as an independent hypnotist by "appointment only." As she is talking, Wolverine suddenly becomes ill, and passes out. Wolverine, initially perplexed, gets into a fight, only to discover that his claws will not pop out. He storms back to her trailer, to find out what she did to him. He is under Mother Night's control. She orders him to hate and kill a man named Max Fisher with rage and anguish. After his last fight in the ring, he takes Sean's van and heads to confront Max Fisher. It turns out Mother Night was married to Max Fisher, and used Wolverine to kill him to get a hold of his fortune. It's also revealed that Sean and Mother Night were working together. Wolverine managed to get his memory back by shooting his head with a double-barreled shotgun. He then meets up with Mother Night, while he is pretending to be hypnotized. He confronts her and slices her jugular, effectively killing her.

Powers and abilities
Mother Night has developed a mastery of hypnotism. Mother Night has to get a person to look at her for her hypnotic abilities to work. Certain individuals are not susceptible to hypnotism.

Mother Night has limited knowledge of street-fighting techniques and karate.

Mother Night's necklace contains a special suggestibility gas as well as a "dark light" casting mechanism and she also uses various brainwashing drugs and paraphernalia.

References

External links
 Mother Night at Marvel.com
 

Characters created by Gene Colan
Characters created by Stan Lee
Comics characters introduced in 1970
Fictional characters from New Jersey
Fictional hypnotists and indoctrinators
Marvel Comics female supervillains
Marvel Comics martial artists
Marvel Comics neo-Nazis